Luka Vudragović (born 2 June 2004) is a Serbian professional basketball player for FMP Meridian of the Basketball League of Serbia and the ABA League.

Early career 
Vudragović grew up playing basketball for youth system of Vizura before joining to the Crvena zvezda youth system in June 2020. Reportedly, in November 2021 at a Serbian Junior League game, Vudragović nearly broke the backboard support with his dunk.

Professional career 
Vudragović was added to the roster of Crvena zvezda for the 2021–22 season. On 3 March 2022, Vudragović officially signed his first professional contract with Crvena zvezda. On 25 March, he was added to a EuroLeague game roster in a 74–70 road lost to Alba Berlin, without making a debut.

On 28 June 2022, Vudragović signed a four-year contract with FMP Meridian.

National team career 
In August 2021, Vudragović was a member of the Serbia U-18 at the FIBA U18 European Challengers in Skopje, North Macedonia. Over five tournament games, he averaged 7.4 points, 2.2 rebounds, and 0.6 assists per game.

References

External links 
 Profile at eurobasket.com
 Profile at euroleague.net
 Profile at realgm.com
 Profile at proballers.com
 Profile at ABA League

2004 births
Living people
ABA League players
KK FMP players
KK Crvena zvezda youth players
KK Žitko Basket players
Serbian men's basketball players
People from Stara Pazova
Shooting guards